The third season of the fantasy comedy television series The Good Place, created by Michael Schur, was renewed on November 21, 2017, on NBC, and began airing on September 27, 2018, in the United States. The season is produced by Fremulon, 3 Arts Entertainment, and Universal Television. The season concluded on January 24, 2019, and contained thirteen episodes.

The series focuses on Eleanor Shellstrop (Kristen Bell), a deceased young woman who wakes up in the afterlife and is welcomed by Michael (Ted Danson) to "the Good Place" in reward for her righteous life; however, she eventually discovers that Michael's "Good Place" is a hoax, and she is actually in the "Bad Place" being psychologically and emotionally tortured by her fellow afterlife residents. William Jackson Harper, Jameela Jamil, and Manny Jacinto co-star as other deceased human residents of the faux Good Place who are similarly being tormented, together with D'Arcy Carden as an artificial being helping the inhabitants. In the third season, the deceased humans have been returned to life on Earth to allow them another chance to improve morally, with some guidance from Michael. Each of the episodes is listed as "Chapter (xx)" following the opening title card.

Cast

Main

 Kristen Bell as Eleanor Shellstrop, a deceased, selfish saleswoman from Phoenix, Arizona who winds up in the Good Place by mistake. In order to earn her spot, she recruits Chidi to teach her the fundamentals of becoming a better person.
 William Jackson Harper as Chidi Anagonye, a deceased Senegalese professor of ethics and moral philosophy at an Australian university. Assigned as Eleanor's soulmate in Michael's first Good Place experiment, he gives her ethics lessons in an attempt to make her a better person.
 Jameela Jamil as Tahani Al-Jamil, a deceased, wealthy English philanthropist who believes she belongs in the Good Place. She forms an unlikely friendship with Eleanor, who initially dislikes her positive attitude, condescending way of speaking, and tendency to name drop.
 D'Arcy Carden as Janet, a programmed guide and knowledge bank who acts as the Good Place's main source of information and can provide its residents with whatever they desire. Later, Janet gains a more humanlike disposition, and begins to act differently than the way she was designed.
 Carden also plays Bad Janet, a disrespectful version of Janet designed not to respond to residents properly; Neutral Janet, an impartial, robotic version of Janet that works in the Accountant's Office; and, for one episode, Janet-versions of Eleanor, Chidi, Tahani, and Jason.
 Manny Jacinto as Jason Mendoza, a deceased amateur DJ and drug dealer from Jacksonville, Florida who winds up in the Good Place by mistake. He is introduced as Jianyu Li, a Taiwanese monk who took a vow of silence. Later, Jason proves to be an immature and unintelligent, but kindhearted Jacksonville Jaguars and Blake Bortles fan.
 Ted Danson as Michael, an architect who runs the Good Place neighborhood in which Eleanor, Chidi, Tahani, and Jason reside. Michael has a deep affinity for the mundane aspects of human life, like playing with paper clips or searching for one's car keys. "Michael" is a Hebrew name meaning "who is like God?"

Recurring
 Marc Evan Jackson as Shawn, Michael's wicked boss. Shawn gives Michael two chances to pull off the torture experiment, and later turns against him when he finds out about Michael's betrayal.
 Maya Rudolph as Judge Gen (short for Hydrogen), an eternal judge who rules on interdimensional matters between the Good Place and the Bad Place.
 Kirby Howell-Baptiste as Simone Garnett, an Australian neuroscientist and, briefly, Chidi's girlfriend.
 Mike O'Malley as Jeff, the gatekeeper of the doorway between the afterlife and Earth. He has an affinity for frogs.
 Adam Scott as Trevor, a cruel Bad Place demon who bullies the main group. He makes a return in the third season, posing as an overenthusiastic member of Chidi's academic study on Earth.
 Ben Lawson as Larry Hemsworth, Tahani's former boyfriend and the fictional fourth Hemsworth brother. Despite being very attractive and successful, he constantly beats himself up.
 Eugene Cordero as Pillboi, Jason's best friend and partner in crime.
 Rebecca Hazlewood as Kamilah Al-Jamil, Tahani's massively successful and competitive younger sister.
 Ajay Mehta as Waqas Al-Jamil, Tahani's father.
 Anna Khaja as Manisha Al-Jamil, Tahani's mother.
 Tiya Sircar as Vicky Sengupta, a Bad Place demon who is introduced as the "real Eleanor Shellstrop" in the first attempt of Michael's torture plan.
 Maribeth Monroe as Mindy St. Claire, a deceased corporate lawyer and cocaine addict who just barely toed the line of earning enough Good Place points before her death and thus was awarded her own private Medium Place.
 Jason Mantzoukas as Derek, a wacky artificial rebound boyfriend created by Janet.

Guest
 Mitch Narito as Donkey Doug, Jason's dopey father.
 Leslie Grossman as Donna Shellstrop, Eleanor's vain, negligent mother. In the third season, it is revealed that she has found peace as a PTA mom in a Nevada suburb.
 Andy Daly as Dave Katterttrune, Donna's boyfriend.
 Michael McKean as Doug Forcett, a Canadian man who has devoted his entire life to earning enough points to get into the Good Place.
 Stephen Merchant as Neil, the head accountant of the afterlife.
 Nicole Byer as Gwendolyn, a postal worker in the Good Place.
 Paul Scheer as Chuck, a member of the Good Place Committee.
 Brad Morris as Matt, an accountant working in a neutral office between the Good Place and the Bad Place, made suicidal by working in "Weird Sex Things".

Episodes

Reception

Critical response
The third season received critical acclaim. On Rotten Tomatoes, the third season has a rating of 98%, based on 47 reviews, with an average rating of 8.35/10. The site's critical consensus reads, "Charming and curious as ever, The Good Place remains a delightfully insightful bright spot on the television landscape." On Metacritic, the third season has a score of 96 out of 100, based on reviews from five critics, indicating "universal acclaim".

Accolades
For the 71st Primetime Emmy Awards, the series received four nominations–for Outstanding Comedy Series, Ted Danson for Outstanding Lead Actor in a Comedy Series, Maya Rudolph for Outstanding Guest Actress in a Comedy Series, and Josh Siegal and Dylan Morgan for Outstanding Writing for a Comedy Series for the episode "Janet(s)". "Janet(s)" also won the Hugo Award for Best Dramatic Presentation, Short Form, with the episode "Jeremy Bearimy" also nominated. Several critics expressed dismay that D'Arcy Carden was not nominated for her work in the episode "Janet(s)", where she portrayed most of the main characters.

Ratings

Notes

References

External links
 
 

2018 American television seasons
2019 American television seasons
The Good Place seasons